The Journal of Nanoparticle Research is a monthly peer-reviewed scientific journal published by Springer Science+Business Media. It focuses mainly on physical, chemical, and biological phenomena and processes in structures of sizes comparable to a few nanometers. It was established in 1999 and the editor-in-chief is Mihail C. Roco (National Science Foundation). According to the Journal Citation Reports, the journal has a 2020 impact factor of 2.253.

References

External links 
 
 JNR website for readers: https://www.springer.com/materials/nanotechnology/journal/11051
 JNR Editorial Manager for paper submissions: https://www.editorialmanager.com/nano/default.aspx

English-language journals
Nanotechnology journals
Publications established in 1999
Springer Science+Business Media academic journals
Monthly journals